The Canaanite languages, or Canaanite dialects, are one of the three subgroups of the Northwest Semitic languages, the others being Aramaic and Ugaritic, all originating in the Levant and Mesopotamia. They are attested in Canaanite inscriptions throughout the Levant, Mesopotamia, Anatolia and the East Mediterranean, and after the founding of Carthage by Phoenician colonists, in coastal regions of North Africa and Iberian Peninsula also. Dialects have been labelled primarily with reference to Biblical geography: Hebrew (Israelian, Judean/Biblical, Samaritan), Phoenician/Punic, Amorite, Ammonite, Moabite, Sutean and Edomite; the dialects were all mutually intelligible, being no more differentiated than geographical varieties of Modern English. This family of languages has the distinction of being the first historically attested group of languages to use an alphabet, derived from the Proto-Canaanite alphabet, to record their writings, as opposed to the far earlier Cuneiform logographic/syllabic writing of the region, which originated in Mesopotamia.

These extremely closely related tongues were spoken by the ancient Semitic people of the Canaan and Levant regions, an area encompassing what is today Israel, Jordan, Sinai, Lebanon, Syria, the Palestinian territories and also some areas of southwestern Turkey (Anatolia), western and southern Iraq (Mesopotamia) and the north western corner of Saudi Arabia. 

The Canaanites are broadly defined to include the Hebrews (including Israelites, Judeans and Samaritans), Amalekites, Ammonites, Amorites, Edomites, Ekronites, Hyksos, Phoenicians (including the Carthaginians), Moabites and Suteans. Although the Amorites are included among the Canaanite peoples, their language is sometimes not considered to be a Canaanite language but very closely related. 

The Canaanite languages continued to be everyday spoken languages until at least the 2nd century AD. Hebrew is the only living Canaanite language today. It remained in continuous use by many Jews well into the Middle Ages and up to the present day as both a liturgical and literary language and was used for commerce between disparate diasporic Jewish communities. It has also remained a liturgical language among Samaritans. Hebrew was revived by Jewish political and cultural activists, particularly through the revitalization and cultivation efforts of Zionists throughout Europe and in Palestine, as an everyday spoken language in the late 19th and early 20th centuries. By the mid-20th century, Modern Hebrew had become the primary language of the Jews of Palestine and was later made the official language of the State of Israel. 

The primary modern reference book for the many extra-biblical Canaanite inscriptions, together with Aramaic inscriptions, is the German-language book Kanaanäische und Aramäische Inschriften, from which inscriptions are often referenced as KAI n (for a number n).

Classification and sources

The Canaanite languages or dialects can be split into the following:

North Canaan
Phoenician (including Punic/Carthaginian). The main sources are the Ahiram sarcophagus inscription, the sarcophagus of Eshmunazar, the Tabnit sarcophagus, the Kilamuwa inscription, the Cippi of Melqart, and the other Byblian royal inscriptions. For later Punic: in Plautus' play Poenulus at the beginning of the fifth act.

South Canaan
 Ammonite – an extinct Hebraic dialect of the Ammonite people mentioned in the Bible.
 Edomite – an extinct Hebraic dialect of the Edomite people mentioned in the Bible and Egyptian texts.
 Hebrew – The only Canaanite language that is a living language, and the most successful example of a revived dead language.
 Moabite – an extinct Hebraic dialect of the Moabite people mentioned in the Bible. The main sources are the Mesha Stele and El-Kerak Stela.

Other
Other possible Canaanite languages:
 Philistine language – called as such to distinguish it from the assumed Indo-European elements of the broader Philistine language. The former is attested by several dozen inscriptions in Phoenician script scattered along Israel's southwest coast, in particular the Ekron Royal Dedicatory Inscription.
 Ugaritic, although the inclusion of this language within Canaanite is disputed.
 The Deir Alla Inscription, written in a dialect with Aramaic and South Canaanite characteristics, which is classified as Canaanite in Hetzron.
 Sutean language, a Semitic language, possibly of the Canaanite branch.
 Amalekite, possibly a Hebraic dialect of southern Canaan.

Comparison to Aramaic

Some distinctive typological features of Canaanite in relation to the still spoken Aramaic are:
The prefix h- used as the definite article (Aramaic has a postfixed -a). That seems to be an innovation of Canaanite.
The first person pronoun being ʼnk (אנכ anok(i) (which is similar to Akkadian, Ancient Egyptian and Berber) versus Aramaic ʼnʼ/ʼny'''.
The *ā > ō vowel shift (Canaanite shift).

Descendants

Modern Hebrew, revived in the modern era from an extinct dialect of the ancient Israelites preserved in literature, poetry, liturgy; also known as Classical Hebrew, the oldest form of the language attested in writing. The original pronunciation of Biblical Hebrew is accessible only through reconstruction. It may also include Ancient Samaritan Hebrew, a dialect formerly spoken by the ancient Samaritans. The main sources of Classical Hebrew are the Hebrew Bible (Tanakh), and inscriptions such as the Gezer calendar and Khirbet Qeiyafa pottery shard. All of the other Canaanite languages seem to have become extinct by the early 1st millennium AD – except Punic, which survived into late antiquity, or possibly even longer.

Slightly varying forms of Hebrew preserved from the first millennium BC until modern times include:
Tiberian Hebrew – Masoretic scholars living in the Jewish community of Tiberias in Palestine c. 750–950 AD.
Mizrahi Hebrew – Mizrahi Jews, liturgical
Yemenite Hebrew – Yemenite Jews, liturgical
Sephardi Hebrew – Sephardi Jews, liturgical
Ashkenazi Hebrew – Ashkenazi Jews, liturgical
Mishnaic Hebrew (Rabbinical Hebrew) – Jews, liturgical, rabbinical, any of the Hebrew dialects found in the Talmud.
Medieval Hebrew – Jews, liturgical, poetical, rabbinical, scientific, literary; lingua franca based on Bible, Mishna and neologisms forms created by translators and commentators
Haskala Hebrew – Jews, scientific, literary and journalistic language based on Biblical but enriched with neologisms created by writers and journalists, a transition to the later
Modern Hebrew used in Israel today
Samaritan Hebrew – Samaritans,  liturgical
The Phoenician and Carthaginian expansion spread the Phoenician language and its Punic dialect to the Western Mediterranean for a time, but there too it died out, although it seems to have survived longer than in Phoenicia itself.

See also 
 Ancient Hebrew writings
 Canaanite and Aramaic inscriptions
 Classification of Semitic languages
 Northwest Semitic languages  
 Proto-Canaanite alphabet
 Shibboleth

References

BibliographyThe Semitic Languages. Routledge Language Family Descriptions.'' Edited by Robert Hetzron. New York: Routledge, 1997.

External links 
Some West Semitic Inscriptions
How the Alphabet Was Born from Hieroglyphs Biblical Archaeology Review

 
Languages extinct in the 1st millennium
1st-millennium disestablishments in Asia